The United Arab Emirates participated at the 2018 Summer Youth Olympics in Buenos Aires, Argentina from 6 October to 18 October 2018.

Equestrian

The United Arab Emirates qualified a rider based on its ranking in the FEI World Jumping Challenge Rankings.

 Individual Jumping - 1 athlete

Golf

The United Arab Emirates received a quota of two athletes to compete by the tripartite committee.
Individual

Team

Karate

Shooting

The United Arab Emirates was given a quota by the tripartite committee to compete in shooting.

 Girls' 10m Air Rifle - 1 quota

Individual

Team

Weightlifting

Boy

Girl

References

2018 in Emirati sport
Nations at the 2018 Summer Youth Olympics
United Arab Emirates at the Youth Olympics